Mustafa al-Hallaj (1938 – 17 December 2002) was born in Salama in the Jaffa region of Mandatory Palestine.

Al-Hallaj was a pioneer in the Arab art world, known as an "icon of contemporary Arab graphic arts." His work was often devoted to his lost homeland, Palestine, and he is also said to have tried to turn Palestine into the form and content of his artistic school.

Biography
After the 1948 Arab–Israeli War, al-Hallaj and his family ended up in Damascus where he completed his higher education in 1964. He studied sculpture at the College of Fine Arts in Cairo and attended the Luxor Atelier for Postgraduate Studies. His art included paintings, graphics, murals, illustrations, cover designs and etchings, with specializations in graphic art and sculpture. He lived in Beirut, Lebanon and Damascus, Syria.

Hallaj contributed to defining the fan al-muqawama (or, "the art of resistance"). He lost 25,000 of his prints in Israeli attacks on Beirut during the 1982 Lebanon war but managed to save the wood and masonry cuts he used to make them.

Hallaj was a founding member of the trade union committee of the General Union of Palestinian Writers and Journalists, and a member of the Managing Committee of the General Union of Palestinian Abstract Artists in Syria. He helped lay the foundation for the establishment of an art gallery in Damascus which at its opening in 1987 was dedicated to the memory of Naji al-Ali Damascus.

Works

Hallaj's work is "inspired by ancient Canaanite legends, folk tales, and Palestinian cultural icons, and is a sequence of pictorial narratives which had reached 114 meters at the time of his death, summarizing the history of the Palestinian people from 11th century BC to the present." Entitled Improvisations of Life, this work is 114 meters long. It portrays visual memories and recollections, and a record of civilization dating back 10000 years – a mix of myth and fertility with the intifada of the Palestinians.

Tex Kerschen calls it "... a master work, a continuum of fantastic and folkloric imagery that spans ancient and modern times. He juxtaposes a vast and often idiosyncratic menagerie of symbols — bulls, camel men, birds, lizard-like creatures and fish, with fantastic landscapes and episodes of ancient and modern Palestinian life ... Scenes from Al Nakba and the universal history of human oppression, such as mass hangings and forced marches, spill into representations that draw from his extensive erudition and his own syncretic imagination." a

Al-Hallaj successfully rescued this work from an electrical fire in his home studio, but died after running in to save other works. He was buried in Yarmouk refugee camp in Damascus.

Al-Hallaj has won several local and international awards and prizes.

References

Further reading
Китаб ат-Тавасин. Сад Знания / ал-Хусайн ибн Мансур ал-Халладж;   Пер.  с  араб. Виктора Нечипуренко,  Ирины Полонской; предисл. В. Нечипуренко. – Ростов н/Д: Ростовское бюро пропаганды художественной литературы Союза писателей РФ, 2007. – 180 с. (Al-Husain ibn Mansur al-Hallaj. Kitab at-Tawasin. The Garden of Knowledge. (Translated into English from the Russian translation of Arabic original).

1938 births
2002 deaths
Palestinian artists
Palestinian emigrants to Lebanon
College of Fine Arts in Cairo alumni